Sapporo Ryūtsū Center (札幌流通総合会館) also known as AXES Sapporo (アクセスサッポロ), is a convention center located in Shiroishi-ku, Sapporo, Hokkaido, Japan.

Overview 
Opened in March 1984, this multipurpose center comprises a large indoor exhibition area of approximately 5,000 m2, and a separated building with: a reception hall, special meeting rooms, class rooms and conference rooms and also a free space in every one of its 3 floors. In addition to this it also includes a large outdoor exhibition area of approximately 2,400 m2.

So far, has been used for conferences, business conventions, commercial training programs, as well as automobile exhibitions (the Sapporo Auto Salon), and all kinds of fairs and expositions (the Health & Beauty Fair Sapporo).

Sapporo Ryūtsū Center was also used as a basketball venue for the Rera Kamuy Hokkaido team in 2010.

Access 
 Tōzai Line: 20 minutes walk from Ōyachi Station.
 JR Hokkaido: 20 minutes walk from Atsubetsu Station.

External links 
 Official site

Convention centers in Japan
Buildings and structures in Sapporo
Tourist attractions in Sapporo
Event venues established in 1984
1984 establishments in Japan